The 2015 European Games, also known as Baku 2015 or Baku 2015 European Games, were the inaugural edition of the European Games, an international multi-sport event for athletes representing the National Olympic Committees (NOCs) of the European Olympic Committees. It took place in Baku, Azerbaijan, from 12 to 28 June 2015, and featured almost 6,000 athletes from 50 countries competing in 30 sports, including 15 summer Olympic and 2 non-Olympic sports.

Host selection

Baku was awarded the right to host the first European Games at the 41st EOC General Assembly in Rome, on 8 December 2012. The European Games will take place every four years thereafter, with the next competition held in 2019.

The decision was made as a result of secret balloting, where of 48 votes, 38 were in favour of the sole bidder for the event. Eight votes were against, and two more abstained from voting. The representatives of Armenia refused to take part in the voting.

Organisation
The Organising Committee responsible for the inaugural European Games in Baku was established by decree of the President of the Republic of Azerbaijan. The committee is chaired by the First Lady of Azerbaijan Mehriban Aliyeva, member of the Executive Committee of the National Olympic Committee of the Republic of Azerbaijan and UNESCO Goodwill Ambassador. Baku 2015 European Games Operations Committee (BEGOC) was established under the direction of the Chairperson of the Organising Committee.

The Chief Executive Officer of BEGOC is Azad Rahimov, Minister of Youth and Sport  while the Chief Operating Officer is Simon Clegg.

Venues

There were four clusters and 18 competition venues for the inaugural European Games, including 12 that were designed to become permanent venues. Five of the venues were new-builds: the National Gymnastics Arena, BMX Velopark, Baku Aquatics Centre, Baku Shooting Centre and National Stadium.
There were six temporary venues: Water Polo Arena, Beach Arena, Basketball Arena, Mountain Bike Velopark, Triathlon, Cycling road race and time trial.

The Athletes Village, located in the Nizami raion of Baku, comprises 13 buildings, 16 different types of apartments with three to four bedrooms per apartment.

Village cluster

Flag square cluster

City cluster

Other venues

Bilgəh beach — road cycling time trials

Ticketing

Adult tickets for sport sessions range between AZN 2 – AZN 5, according to competition round (for example preliminary or final), seat category, and venue.

Volunteers
Organisers aimed to recruit 12,500 volunteers to play roles during the Games, including assisting athletes and dignitaries, working at sport competitions, or providing assistance to spectators or the media. Baku 2015 European Games volunteers were called Flamekeepers. 6,000 Ceremonies Performers voluntarily took part in the opening and closing ceremonies.

Opening ceremony

Closing ceremony
The Closing Ceremony was held on 28 June in the National Stadium. James Hadley was the Artistic Director and Christian Steinhäuser was the Music Director of the Closing Ceremony.

Games

Participating NOCs

50 national olympic committees participated in this European Games edition, including the Olympic Committee of Kosovo in its first time at a wide multi-sport event. Since the Faroe Islands and Gibraltar are not members of the European Olympic Committee, the Faroese participants occurred for the Ligue Européenne de Natation and the Gibraltar participants for the Athletic Association of Small States of Europe.

An exception to the ban on Armenian citizens or people of Armenian ethnicity entering Azerbaijan (because of the state of war between these countries) was made for these games; see Armenian ethnicity.

Sports
A total of 20 sports was represented: 16 Olympic sports, two Olympic sports contested only in non-Olympic formats (basketball and football) and two non-Olympic sports (karate and sambo). Two para-sport events were contested judo. Twelve of the sports (archery, athletics, boxing, cycling, judo, shooting, swimming, table tennis, taekwondo, triathlon, volleyball, wrestling) would offer qualification opportunities for the Rio 2016 Summer Olympics. The aquatic sports are only open to junior-level competitors, and the athletics competition forms the third division of the European Team Championships.

 Aquatics
 Diving (8)
 Swimming (42)
 Synchronised swimming (4)
 Water polo (2)
 Archery (5)
 Athletics (1)
 Badminton (5)
 Basketball (3x3) (2)
 Beach soccer (1)
 Boxing (15)
 Canoe sprint (15)
 Cycling
 BMX (2)
 Mountain biking (2)
 Road (4)
 Fencing (12)
 Gymnastics
 Acrobatic (6)
 Aerobic (2)
 Artistic (14)
 Rhythmic (8)
 Trampoline (4)
 Judo (16)
 Para-Judo (2)
 Karate (12)
 Sambo (8)
 Shooting (19)
 Table tennis (4)
 Taekwondo (8)
 Triathlon (2)
 Volleyball
 Beach (2)
 Indoor (2)
 Wrestling
 Freestyle (16)
 Greco-Roman (8)

Calendar
The competition schedule consists of 253 events.

Medal table

Podium sweeps

Broadcasting
International Sports Broadcasting (ISB) was the host broadcaster of the European Games. During the Games, ISB was anticipated to produce 800 hours of broadcast coverage.

 Europe

  – Tring Media
  – ORF
  – AzTV
  – BTRC
  – Sport 10
  – BNT HD
  – SPTV
  – ČT • DigiSport
  – TV 2
  – ERR
  – Yle
  and  – L'Equipe 21
  – GPB
  – Sport1
  – ERT
  – DigiSport
  – Setanta Sports
  – Sport 5 • Sport1
  – Sky Sport
  – RTK
  – LTV
  – TV6
  – RTL Group
  – Moldova Sport TV
  – MKRTV
  – NOS
  – TV 2
  – Polsat
  – Sport TV
  – DigiSport
  – Russia-2 • Sport-1
  – RTS
  – DigiSport
  – Šport TV
  – RTVE
  – Sport1
  – NTV Spor
  – BT Sport
  – NTU

 Rest of the world

 Africa – Fox Sports Africa
  – Sport TV
  – ASBU
  – Seven Network
  – Universal Sports
  – CCTV
  – ICRT
  – TVB
  – NEO Sports
  – GEM GROUP
  – TBS
 Latin America – América Móvil
  – Sport TV
  – SBS
  – Sky Sport
  – Setanta Sports
  – ESPN
  – Setanta Sports

Controversies

Human rights situation and media bans
Amnesty International have been a vocal critic of the Baku 2015 European Games, stating in March 2015, "Azerbaijan may be a safe country for athletes taking part in the 100 metres, but defending rights and free speech is a dangerous game here. Those who champion them receive harassment and prison sentences instead of medals.". In August 2014, the human rights organisation highlighted the 24 prisoners of conscience being held in Azerbaijan prisons as an example of abuses. Western countries also criticized Aliyev's intention to close the OSCE offices in Baku.

In June 2015, The Guardian reported that its own reporters, along with those of other media outlets, had been barred from entering Baku to cover the games. Human Rights Watch, in the same article, stated it had observed "the worst crackdown the country has seen in the post-Soviet era".

Most European heads of state and government refused to participate at the opening ceremony, sending mid- or low-level representatives instead. Among those who did participate were Vladimir Putin of Russia, Recep Tayyip Erdoğan of Turkey, Aleksander Lukashenko of Belarus, Boyko Borisov of Bulgaria and Victor Ponta of Romania. Ponta and Borisov faced criticism at home for their participation.

Bus accident
During the games there was a road accident where a coach driver drove into a group of young Austrian athletes by mixing up the accelerator and brake pedals, with the incident recorded by a surveillance camera. 15-year-old Austrian synchronized swimmer Vanessa Sahinovic and her teammates Lisa Breit and Luna Pajer were injured. Sahinovic was placed in an induced coma and flown to Vienna for emergency surgery. Sahinovic was left paraplegic in the accident. Because of the accident, Austria had to withdraw from the team competition. In the synchronized swimming duet competition, sisters Anna-Maria and Eirini-Maria Alexandri won the silver medal, which they dedicated to the injured teammates. The police officer who released the video of the surveillance camera was relieved of his duties. Sahinovic is recovering, and is supported by an initiative of Austrian swimmers and a fundraising campaign.

Marketing

Logo and mascots

The official logo for the 2015 European Games was unveiled on 16 June 2014. Designed by Adam Yunusov, it was inspired by country's ancient and contemporary culture. The logo includes flame, water, the mythical Simurgh bird, an Azerbaijani carpet and a pomegranate as one of the symbols of Azerbaijani profusion. The pomegranate, called Nar (pomegranate in Azerbaijani), is one of two mascots for the Games, along with a gazelle named Jeyran (gazelle in Azerbaijani). The couple are intended to represent the spirit of Azerbaijan and help excite the youth for the event.

Brand and visual identity
The brand incorporates traditional Azerbaijani imagery with images and colours designed to evoke a European sporting feel. The pomegranate tree, whose fruit juice is one of Azerbaijan's main exports, features heavily. The brand was created with legacy potential in mind, possibly inspired by the way the Commonwealth Games’ branding retains a similar feel each year.

As Azerbaijan as a state sponsored Spanish football club Atlético Madrid at that time, this European Games was advertised on the club's kits during the later half of their 2014–15 season.

Sponsors
On 21 May 2014, Procter & Gamble became the first official partner of the inaugural European Games. Swiss watchmaker Tissot has been named the official timekeeper and will provide all timing and scoring services. On 13 November 2014, Motorola Solutions also teamed up with Baku 2015 as the Official Radio Communications Supporter.

Torch relay
On Sunday 26 April the President of the Republic of Azerbaijan, Ilham Aliyev, captured the official flame of the Baku 2015 European Games. The flame had visited 60 locations until the final torchbearer entered the National Stadium for the Opening Ceremony on 12 June.

Route

26 April (day 1)
Ateshgah
27 April (day 2)
Nakhchivan
29 April (day 3)
Lankaran
1 May (day 4)
Lerik
Astara
2 May (day 5)
Yardimli
Jalilabad
3 May (day 6)
Bilesuvar
Masalli
4 May (day 7)
Salyan
Neftchala
5 May (day 8)
Shirvan
Hajigabul
6 May (day 9)
Saatli
Sabirabad
7 May (day 10)
Imishli
Horadiz
9 May (day 11)
Beylagan
Gunesli
10 May (day 12)
Agjabedi
Khojavend
12 May (day 13)
Zardab
Terter
13 May (day 14)
Yevlakh
Barda
14 May (day 15)
Goranboy
Naftalan
15 May (day 16)
Goygol
Ganja
16 May (day 17)
Dashkasan
Samukh
18 May (day 18)
Gazakh
Agstafa
19 May (day 19)
Tovuz
Gadabay
20 May (day 20)
Shamkir
21 May (day 21)
Ujar
Goychay
22 May (day 22)
Agdash
Mingachevir
23 May (day 23)
Balaken
Zagatala
24 May (day 24)
Gakh
25 May (day 25)
Oghuz
Sheki
26 May (day 26)
Ismayilli
Gabala
27 May (day 27)
Kurdemir
29 May (day 28)
Aghsu
30 May (day 29)
Gobustan
Shamakhi
31 May (day 30)
Sumgayit
Khizi
1 June (day 31)
Gusar
Guba
3 June (day 32)
Khachmaz
4 June (day 33)
Shabran
5 June (day 34)
Siyazan
Khirdalan
6 June (day 35)
Gobustan National Park
7-11 June (days 36, 37, 38, 39 and 40)
Baku
12 June (day 41)
Baku National Stadium

References

External links

 
2015
European Games
European Games
European Games
International sports competitions hosted by Azerbaijan
Multi-sport events in Azerbaijan
Sports competitions in Baku
2010s in Baku
European Games